Cleoniceras is a rather involute, high-whorled hoplitid from the Lower to basal Middle Albian of Europe, Madagascar, and Transcaspian region.  The shell has a generally small umbilicus, arched to acute venter, and typically at some growth stage, falcoid ribs that spring in pairs from umbilical tubercles, usually disappearing on the outer whorls.

Cleoniceras is included in the subfamily Cleoniceratinae.

Species
This genus contains the species C. cleon and C. besairiei.

References
Treatise on Invertebrate Paleontology, Part L (Ammonoidea). R.C. Moore (ed). Geological Soc of America and Univ. Kansas Press (1957), p L394

Ammonitida
Ammonites of Europe